The 2001 Nokia Cup, southern Ontario men's provincial curling championship was held February 5-11 at the Woodstock District Community Complex in Woodstock, Ontario.  The winning Wayne Middaugh rink from Toronto would represent Ontario at the 2001 Nokia Brier in Ottawa.
This would be the first year that the Page playoff system would be used in provincial playdowns.

Teams

Standings

Tie breakers
Turcotte 9-4 Cochrane
Moffatt 8-4 Turcotte

Playoffs

Sources
Nokia Cup - Coverage on curlingzone.com

Ontario Nokia Cup
Ontario Tankard
Sport in Woodstock, Ontario
Nokia Cup
Ontario Nokia Cup